Peder Wright Cappelen (18 January 1931 – 4 January 1992) was a Norwegian playwright, non-fiction writer and publisher.

Personal life
Cappelen was born in Bærum to publisher Jørgen Wright Cappelen and Ragni Holm Johannessen. He was married first to art historian Tone Wikborg (daughter of Erling Wikborg), and from 1966 to actress Kari Simonsen.

Career
From 1958, Cappelen headed the publishing house Helge Erichsens Forlag, which published Kjell Aukrust's and Marcel Proust's books. 

Cappelen's books include Eventyret ute (1960), Alene med vidda (1964), and three books illustrated by Jens Johannessen, Høstblad (1976), Fugl i vår (1979) and Sommerfabel, fra Vidda til Skagen (1983). He has written plays inspired by fairytales, historical plays and plays for children.

References

1931 births
1992 deaths
Writers from Bærum
Norwegian dramatists and playwrights
Norwegian nature writers
Norwegian publishers (people)
Peder Wright